The women's 200 metre freestyle event at the 2014 Commonwealth Games as part of the swimming programme took place on 24 July at the Tollcross International Swimming Centre in Glasgow, Scotland.

The medals were presented by Gideon Sam, Vice-President of the Commonwealth Games Federation and President of the South African Sports Confederation and Olympic Committee and the quaichs were presented by John Mason, Board member of Glasgow 2014.

Records
Prior to this competition, the existing world and Commonwealth Games records were as follows.

The following records were established during the competition:

Results

Heats

Final

References

External links

Women's 200 metre freestyle
Commonwealth Games
2014 in women's swimming